Nor je ta svet is Neisha's second studio album, released in 2007.

Track listing
"Zaradi upanja"
"Vrtiljak"
"Ogenj pod nogami"
"Cvetni prah ljubezni"
"Pod enim dežnikom"
"Stokrat bolje mi je zdaj"
"Občutek"
"Vedno za vedno"
"Nor je ta svet"
"Midnight"
"Blame me"
"You and me"

External links
Neisha's official website

2007 albums
Neisha albums